John Herbert Hollomon Jr. (March 12, 1919 – May 8, 1985) was a noted American engineer and founding member of the National Academy of Engineering.

Biography
Hollomon was born in Norfolk, Virginia, and in 1946 received his D.Sc. from the Massachusetts Institute of Technology (MIT) in metallurgy. He then joined the General Electric laboratories in Schenectady, New York, where he eventually became general manager.

In 1962, he was appointed first assistant secretary for science and technology at the United States Department of Commerce. In this role he established the Environmental Sciences Services Administration (later, the National Oceanic and Atmospheric Administration), the Commerce Technical Advisory Board, and the State Technical Services program. He served for part of 1967 as acting under secretary of commerce, but left government for the University of Oklahoma where he served one year as president-designate and two as President.

In 1970, Hollomon returned to MIT as consultant to the president and subsequently as Professor of Engineering. In 1983, he moved to the Boston University campus, where he remained until his death.

See also
Hollomon–Jaffe parameter
Zener–Hollomon parameter
Strain hardening exponent
Work hardening

References

External links 
 National Academy of Engineering memorial tribute

20th-century American engineers
Founding members of the United States National Academy of Engineering
Presidents of the University of Oklahoma
1919 births
1985 deaths
20th-century American academics